This is a list of Indian Air Force personnel who have received awards for gallantry related to their service.

Param Vir Chakra

 Nirmal Jit Singh Sekhon

Maha Vir Chakra
 Wg Cdr Jag Mohan Nath (1962, 1965)
Harcharan Singh Manget
• Air Commodore William Macdonald "Jimmy" Goodman

Vir Chakra
 Wing Commander Amar Jit Singh Sandhu
 Jasjit Singh (IAF officer)
 Krishan Kant Saini
 Trevor Keelor
 Denzil Keelor
 Ajay Ahuja
 Abhinandan Varthaman
 Vinod Neb (Received twice (bar to VrC). Once in 1965 and 1971.)

Ashoka Chakra
 Suhas Biswas
 Rakesh Sharma
 Jyoti Prakash Nirala

Kirti Chakra
 Denzil Keelor
Dev Raj Singh Thakur
Darryl Castelino

Shaurya Chakra
 Varun Singh (Indian Air Force Officer)
Devendra Mehta
Khairnar Milind Kishor
Nilesh Kumar Nayan
Gursewak Singh

References

Lists of Indian award winners